Vaccinium floribundum, commonly known as mortiño or Andean blueberry, is a slender shrub that grows in the northern Andes in Bolivia, Colombia, Ecuador, Peru and Venezuela at elevations from . The plant produces an edible fruit, a round berry that is bluish black and glaucous, that is collected and eaten raw and used in preserves. It is sold at some markets and is used for Colada Morada celebrating the Day of the Dead.

References

External links 
Photo of herbarium specimen at Missouri Botanical Garden, collected in Peru in 2012

floribundum
Flora of South America
Berries
Plants described in 1819